Stereocaulon rivulorum is a species of snow lichen belonging to the family Stereocaulaceae.

Ecology
Stereocaulon rivulorum is a known host to the lichenicolous fungus species:

 Arthonia stereocaulina
 Catillaria stereocaulorum
 Cercidospora stereocaulorum
 Dactylospora deminuta
 Diploschistes muscorum
 Lasiosphaeriopsis stereocaulicola
 Lichenopeltella stereocaulorum
 Licheonsticta dombrovskae
 Niesslia peltigericola
 Opegrapha stereocaulicola
 Polycoccum trypethelioides
 Rhymbocarpus stereocaulorum
 Sphaerellothecium araneosum
 Sphaerellothecium stereocaulorum
 Taeniolella christiansenii

References

Stereocaulaceae
Lichen species
Taxa named by Adolf Hugo Magnusson
Lichens described in 1926